Khomgaran (also Romanized as Khomgarān) is a village in Zamkan Rural District, in the Zamkan District of Salas-e Babajani County, Kermanshah Province, Iran. At the 2006 census, its population was 102, in 25 families.

References 

Populated places in Salas-e Babajani County